The Life-Sized Unicorn Gundam Statue is a full-scale statue of the RX-0 Unicorn Gundam from the series Mobile Suit Gundam Unicorn installed outside Odaiba's DiverCity Tokyo Plaza, in Tokyo, Japan. It replaced a previous statue of the RX-78-2 Gundam.

References

External links

 

Gundam
Odaiba
Outdoor sculptures in Tokyo
Statues in Japan
Statues of fictional characters